Black Tar Heroin: The Dark End of the Street is a 1999 television documentary film directed by Steven Okazaki. Filmed from 1995 to 1998 in the Tenderloin, San Francisco, California, the documentary describes the lives of heroin addicts.

Overview
The film follows a simple structure, and shows the drug-related degradation of five youths (Jake, Tracey, Jessica, Alice, Oreo) during the course of three years.  The film depicts their drug-related crimes and diseases, including prostitution, male prostitution, AIDS, and lethal overdoses.

In a 2004 follow up interview with Tracey Helton, she reveals she is now a full-time drug counselor, while Jessica is still working as a prostitute despite having HIV. Alice McMunn has been sober since 02.20.01; she is a model and professional exotic dancer. Oreo's whereabouts are unknown; his girlfriend Jennifer went to treatment. After she relapsed, she later died from a drug induced asthma attack while on Shotwell St. in San Francisco. Her friend, Kari Guilinger, attempted to give her CPR with the help of a FoodsCo employee while waiting for paramedics to arrive, but were unable to save her life. She was pronounced dead upon arrival at Davies County Hospital. Jake overcame his heroin addiction and began methadone treatment. Shortly after stopping his methadone and the break-up with his first clean and sober girlfriend, Jake was found dead of a drug overdose in January 2002. Tracey's boyfriend, Ben, died of an overdose just one week after being released from jail on a burglary charge.

In a further update on YouTube, Tracey known as traceyh415, revealed she had earned a master's degree, married and become a mother to three kids; as of July 2015 update, she stated she was 16 years clean. She has written one book already and has a second one "The Big Fix: Hope After Heroin" on the way. Tracey works in the community she used to use drugs in, helping those who suffer from addiction.

Tracy Helton posted a comment on the 2004 update video on YouTube that reads as follows: “Oreo, Jessica, Alice, and myself are all clean. Posting this comment on 3/23/14.”

Release
 The film was produced by HBO and was frequently shown in 1999 on the channel, as part of their "America Undercover" series, becoming one of its top-rated documentaries.
 The documentary received a theatrical release on March 17, 2000, at San Francisco's Roxie Theatre, and is still available on DVD.

Soundtrack 
Songs featured in the film:
 Good Clean Fun – Cat Power
 Sweet Ride – Belly
 Don't Try Suicide – Team Dresch
 She's Coming Over – Mr. T Experience
 Long Goodbye – Ovarian Trolley
 Some Foggy Mountain Top – Mr. T Experience
 Why Are You Unkind – Varnaline
 Never Lonely Alone – Space Needle
 Dark End of the Street – Eve Bekker & Karl J. Goldring

References

External links 
Official site for the film
 Interview with director Steven Okazaki about the film
 Article on Bright Lights Film Journal
 

1999 television films
1999 films
American documentary television films
Films about heroin addiction
Films directed by Steven Okazaki
Documentary films about drug addiction
1999 documentary films
Films shot in San Francisco
1990s English-language films
1990s American films